Pavlos D. Vasileiadis (born 1974) is a Greek theologian, translator and a researcher in Biblical Studies in the Faculty of Theology at the Aristotle University of Thessaloniki. He has been an author and editor of the Μεγάλη Ορθόδοξη Χριστιανική Εγυκλοπαίδεια (MOXE) [Great Orthodox Christian Encyclopedia].

Life

Education 

Vasileiadis has studied at the Aristotle University of Thessaloniki and in 1996 he earned a B.A. in Applied sciences: IT Engineering. In 2011 Vasileiadis got a B.A. in Theology at the Aristotle University of Thessaloniki. In 2013 he obtained a Th.M. in Biblical Literature and Religion with the thesis Κόμμα Ιωάννου (Α' Ιωάννη 5:7, 8): Μελέτη στην παρεμβολή και στην απομάκρυνσή του από το Βιβλικό κείμενο, under the tutelage of Petros B. Vassiliadis. From 2017 he holds a Th.D. in Biblical Literature and Religion from the Aristotle University of Thessaloniki with the dissertation Το ιερό Τετραγράμματο και η πρόσληψή του στη μεσαιωνική γραμματεία: Μελέτη στη μεταφραστική απόδοση της εβραϊκής θεωνυμίας με έμφαση σε δύο βιβλικές μεταφράσεις under the supervision of Miltiadis Konstantinou. From 2017 he become Post-doc Researcher in Biblical Literature and Religion and he submitted the thesis in 2020 Η απόδοση του Τετραγράμματου στα Ελληνικά στις ιερές Γραφές και την υπόλοιπη γραμματεία: Μελέτη στη διαχρονική πρόσληψη και εξέλιξη της εβραϊκής θεωνυμίας under the guidance of Miltiadis Konstantinou. In 2022 he earned a Sc.M. in Web Intelligence, IT Engineering at the International Hellenic University with the thesis υφυείς Ψηφιακοί Βοηθοί: Συστηματική καταγραφή και κριτική παρουσίαση της τρέχουσας κατάστασης.

Work 

Vasileiadis specializes in textual criticism and translation research of the Hebrew and Greek texts of the Bible.

Affiliations 

Vasileiadis has been member of the Society of Biblical Literature, the International Organization for Septuagint and Cognate Studies, the European Association of Biblical Studies, the Institute of Hebrew Bible Manuscript Research, the Πανελλήνια Ένωση Καθηγητών Πληροφορικής and the Ομοσπονδία Λειτουργών Μέσης Εκπαίδευσης.

Bibliography

Theses

Books

References

Sources 

1974 births
Living people
Aristotle University of Thessaloniki alumni